Elmwood Park is a village in Racine County, Wisconsin, United States. The population was 510 at the 2020 census.

Geography
Elmwood Park is located at  (42.691319, -87.822167).

Demographics

2010 census
As of the census of 2010, there were 497 people, 197 households, and 152 families living in the village. The racial makeup of the village was 90.5% White, 4.2% African American, 0.2% Native American, 2.4% Asian, 1.8% from other races, and 0.8% from two or more races. Hispanic or Latino of any race were 5.0% of the population.

There were 197 households, of which 26.9% had children under the age of 18 living with them, 66.5% were married couples living together, 6.6% had a female householder with no husband present, 4.1% had a male householder with no wife present, and 22.8% were non-families. 17.3% of all households were made up of individuals, and 10.6% had someone living alone who was 65 years of age or older. The average household size was 2.52 and the average family size was 2.87.

The median age in the village was 48.9 years. 22.3% of residents were under the age of 18; 4.3% were between the ages of 18 and 24; 18.5% were from 25 to 44; 34.4% were from 45 to 64; and 20.3% were 65 years of age or older. The gender makeup of the village was 49.9% male and 50.1% female.

2000 census
As of the census of 2000, there were 474 people, 200 households, and 147 families living in the village. The population density was 3,205.8 people per square mile (1,220.1/km2). There were 204 housing units at an average density of 1,379.7 per square mile (525.1/km2). The racial makeup of the village was 96.62% White and 3.38% African American. Hispanic or Latino of any race were 1.27% of the population.

There were 200 households, out of which 23.0% had children under the age of 18 living with them, 67.0% were married couples living together, 5.5% had a female householder with no husband present, and 26.5% were non-families. 22.0% of all households were made up of individuals, and 11.0% had someone living alone who was 65 years of age or older. The average household size was 2.37 and the average family size was 2.76.

In the village, the population was spread out, with 17.7% under the age of 18, 5.9% from 18 to 24, 20.9% from 25 to 44, 37.8% from 45 to 64, and 17.7% who were 65 years of age or older. The median age was 48 years. For every 100 females, there were 100.0 males. For every 100 females age 18 and over, there were 92.1 males.

The median income for a household in the village was $71,389, and the median income for a family was $74,205. Males had a median income of $48,750 versus $30,833 for females. The per capita income for the village was $30,551. None of the families and 1.6% of the population were living below the poverty line, including no under eighteens and 2.6% of those over 64.

Public safety
Law enforcement services are contracted with the Racine County Sheriff's Office. Fire protection and ambulance service is provided by South Shore Fire Department.

Governance
Since its inception, the Village of Elmwood Park has been governed by a Village Board of 6 Trustees and a Village President along with a hired Clerk/Treasurer. In 2018, the Village Board created the Village Administrator position which handed much of the responsibilities that were handled by the Village Board to the Administrator. This position was combined with the Clerk/Treasurer. In August of 2018, Christophe E. Jenkins of West Bend, WI, was hired as the inaugural Village Administrator/Clerk/Treasurer.

References

External links
 Village website

Villages in Racine County, Wisconsin
Villages in Wisconsin